The 1952 Duke Blue Devils baseball team represented Duke University in the 1952 NCAA baseball season. The Blue Devils played their home games at Jack Coombs Field. The team was coached by Jack Coombs in his 24th year at Duke.

The Blue Devils won the District III playoff to advanced to the College World Series, where they were defeated by the Western Michigan Broncos.

Roster

Schedule 

! style="" | Regular Season
|- valign="top" 

|- align="center" bgcolor="#ccffcc"
| 1 || March 25 || at  || Unknown • Columbia, South Carolina || 3–1 || 1–0 || 1–0
|- align="center" bgcolor="#ccffcc"
| 2 || March 26 || at  || Unknown • Greenville, South Carolina || 6–1 || 2–0 || 2–0
|- align="center" bgcolor="#ccffcc"
| 3 || March 27 || at Furman || Unknown • Greenville, South Carolina || 4–1 || 3–0 || 3–0
|- align="center" bgcolor="#ccffcc"
| 4 || March 28 || at  || Riggs Field • Clemson, South Carolina || 14–8 || 4–0 || 4–0
|- align="center" bgcolor="#ffcccc"
| 5 || March 29 || at Clemson || Riggs Field • Clemson, South Carolina || 9–10 || 4–1 || 4–1
|-

|- align="center" bgcolor="#ccffcc"
| 6 || April 2 ||  || Jack Coombs Field • Durham, North Carolina || 9–2 || 5–1 || 4–1
|- align="center" bgcolor="#ccffcc"
| 7 || April 3 || Yale || Jack Coombs Field • Durham, North Carolina || 12–3 || 6–1 || 4–1
|- align="center" bgcolor="#ccffcc"
| 8 || April 4 ||  || Jack Coombs Field • Durham, North Carolina || 10–9 || 7–1 || 4–1
|- align="center" bgcolor="#ccffcc"
| 9 || April 7 ||  || Jack Coombs Field • Durham, North Carolina || 13–4 || 8–1 || 4–1
|- align="center" bgcolor="#ccffcc"
| 10 || April 8 || Penn || Jack Coombs Field • Durham, North Carolina || 13–4 || 9–1 || 4–1
|- align="center" bgcolor="#ccffcc"
| 11 || April 9 || at  || Emerson Field • Chapel Hill, North Carolina || 4–2 || 10–1 || 5–1
|- align="center" bgcolor="#ffcccc"
| 12 || April 11 ||  || Jack Coombs Field • Durham, North Carolina || 1–4 || 10–2 || 5–1
|- align="center" bgcolor="#ccffcc"
| 13 || April 12 || at  || Riddick Stadium • Raleigh, North Carolina || 13–2 || 11–2 || 6–1
|- align="center" bgcolor="#ccffcc"
| 14 || April 14 || Clemson || Jack Coombs Field • Durham, North Carolina || 6–2 || 12–2 || 7–1
|- align="center" bgcolor="#ccffcc"
| 15 || April 16 ||  || Jack Coombs Field • Durham, North Carolina || 16–1 || 13–2 || 8–1
|- align="center" bgcolor="#ccffcc"
| 16 || April 17 || at NC State || Riddick Stadium • Raleigh, North Carolina || 18–9 || 14–2 || 9–1
|- align="center" bgcolor="#ccffcc"
| 17 || April 18 || Furman || Jack Coombs Field • Durham, North Carolina || 20–5 || 15–2 || 10–1
|- align="center" bgcolor="#ccffcc"
| 18 || April 19 || North Carolina || Jack Coombs Field • Durham, North Carolina || 13–5 || 16–2 || 11–1
|- align="center" bgcolor="#ccffcc"
| 19 || April 22 || at  || Unknown • Winston-Salem, North Carolina || 8–1 || 17–2 || 12–1
|- align="center" bgcolor="#ccffcc"
| 20 || April 24 || at Davidson || Unknown • Davidson, North Carolina || 11–2 || 18–2 || 13–1
|-

|- align="center" bgcolor="#ccffcc"
| 21 || May 1 || North Carolina || Jack Coombs Field • Durham, North Carolina || 10–2 || 19–2 || 14–1
|- align="center" bgcolor="#ccffcc"
| 22 || May 3 || Wake Forest || Jack Coombs Field • Durham, North Carolina || 6–4 || 20–2 || 15–1
|- align="center" bgcolor="#ffcccc"
| 23 || May 6 || NC State || Jack Coombs Field • Durham, North Carolina || 2–13 || 20–3 || 15–2
|- align="center" bgcolor="#ccffcc"
| 24 || May 7 || at Wake Forest || Unknown • Winston-Salem, North Carolina || 8–7 || 21–3 || 16–2
|- align="center" bgcolor="#ccffcc"
| 25 || May 9 || Wake Forest || Jack Coombs Field • Durham, North Carolina || 14–11 || 22–3 || 17–2
|- align="center" bgcolor="#ffcccc"
| 26 || May 10 || at North Carolina || Emerson Field • Chapel Hill, North Carolina || 9–13 || 22–4 || 17–3
|- align="center" bgcolor="#ccffcc"
| 27 || May 12 || NC State || Jack Coombs Field • Durham, North Carolina || 6–0 || 23–4 || 18–3
|- align="center" bgcolor="#ccffcc"
| 28 || May 15 || NC State || Jack Coombs Field • Durham, North Carolina || 6–0 || 23–4 || 18–3
|-

|-
|-
! style="" | Postseason
|- valign="top"

|- align="center" bgcolor="#ccffcc"
| 29 || May 15 || vs  || Devereaux Meadow • Raleigh, North Carolina || 7–5 || 24–4 || 18–3
|- align="center" bgcolor="#ffcccc"
| 30 || May 16 || vs NC State || Devereaux Meadow • Raleigh, North Carolina || 4–5 || 24–5 || 18–3
|- align="center" bgcolor="#ccffcc"
| 31 || May 17 || vs George Washington || Devereaux Meadow • Raleigh, North Carolina || 8–4 || 25–5 || 18–3
|- align="center" bgcolor="#ccffcc"
| 32 || May 18 || vs NC State || Devereaux Meadow • Raleigh, North Carolina || 6–0 || 26–5 || 18–3
|- align="center" bgcolor="#ccffcc"
| 33 || May 18 || vs NC State || Devereaux Meadow • Raleigh, North Carolina || 8–3 || 27–5 || 18–3
|-

|- align="center" bgcolor="#ccffcc"
| 34 || June 5 || vs  || Unknown • Annapolis, Maryland || 7–1 || 28–5 || 18–3
|- align="center" bgcolor="#ffcccc"
| 35 || June 6 || vs  || Unknown • Annapolis, Maryland || 5–4 || 29–5 || 18–3
|- align="center" bgcolor="#ccffcc"
| 36 || June 7 || vs  || Unknown • Annapolis, Maryland || 4–3 || 30–5 || 18–3
|-

|- align="center" bgcolor="#ccffcc"
| 37 || June 12 || vs Oregon State || Omaha Municipal Stadium • Omaha, Nebraska || 18–7 || 31–5 || 18–3
|- align="center" bgcolor="#ffcccc"
| 38 || June 13 || vs Penn State || Omaha Municipal Stadium • Omaha, Nebraska || 7–12 || 31–6 || 18–3
|- align="center" bgcolor="#ffcccc"
| 39 || June 14 || vs Western Michigan || Omaha Municipal Stadium • Omaha, Nebraska || 3–5 || 31–7 || 18–3
|-

Awards and honors 
Dick Groat
 All-Southern Conference Team
 First Team All-American American Baseball Coaches Association

Footer Johnson
 All-Southern Conference Team

Joe Lewis
 All-Southern Conference Team
 First Team All-American Coaches

Red Smith
 All-Southern Conference Team

Billy Werber
 All-Southern Conference Team
 Second Team All-American Coaches

References 

Duke Blue Devils baseball seasons
Duke Blue Devils baseball
College World Series seasons
Duke
Southern Conference baseball champion seasons